Adrián "Adri" Ruiz Ortiz (born 21 August 1988 in Málaga, Andalusia) is a Spanish footballer plays for Alhaurín de la Torre CF as a left midfielder.

External links

1988 births
Living people
Footballers from Málaga
Spanish footballers
Association football midfielders
Segunda División players
Segunda División B players
Tercera División players
Divisiones Regionales de Fútbol players
Marbella FC players
Caravaca CF players
Atlético Malagueño players
Xerez CD footballers
CD El Palo players
Lucena CF players